The Town Santa Forgot is a 1993 animated Christmas television special produced by Hanna-Barbera, narrated by Dick Van Dyke and originally broadcast on NBC. It is an adaptation of the poem Jeremy Creek, written by Charmaine Severson. Since then, it was frequently shown in Christmas marathons on Cartoon Network until 2005, and is still shown annually on Boomerang.

Plot
On a snowy Christmas Eve, a pair of anxious young children eagerly anticipate the arrival of Santa Claus and the gifts that they will be receiving. Taking notice of this, their grandfather narrates a poetic fable with the intentions of educating them on the true nature of the holidays.

The tale details the life of an outrageously overindulged, bratty 5-year-old named Jeremy Creek, who is excessively spoiled by his mild and intimidated parents, flinging himself into destructive and violent temper tantrums when his demands are not met. After his parents decide to stand their ground by refusing to indulge their son any longer, an infuriated Jeremy, recalling the upcoming Christmas season, decides to write Santa Claus a lengthy and demanding wish list consisting of all the presents that he does not yet own. However, when Santa receives the massive list, he assumes that it was written on behalf of multiple people. He discovers an impoverished swamp town coincidentally named "Jeremy Creek" on his map, and realizing he has never delivered them presents before, resolves to make up for his prior absences.

On Christmas morning, Jeremy is crestfallen to discover there are no gifts for him beneath the Christmas tree, and catches sight of a news broadcast detailing the joy of the penniless and bedraggled children of the town Jeremy Creek upon receiving the countless presents from Santa. Surprisingly, Jeremy himself is touched by the joy brought to the less fortunate through his own greed inadvertently, and his self-absorption is dissolved upon the realization of the true meaning of Christmas. Santa also visits Jeremy to apologize for the mistake, and in recognition of his newfound selflessness, Santa offers him the opportunity to help him deliver gifts every Christmas Eve. Jeremy agrees, giving away many of his own toys, and continues to aid Santa until he grows too big to fit in the sleigh.

The elderly gentleman concludes the story by explaining that Santa selects new assistants like Jeremy every few years. The grandchildren, taking the story to heart, are no longer quite as concerned with toys. As the special concludes, the two grandchildren ponder if one of them could be Santa's assistant, and the grandfather muses the same could be true of him, as the name on his mailbox reveals that the grandpa is actually Jeremy Creek himself.

Cast
 Dick Van Dyke - Narrator / Jeremy Creek
 Miko Hughes - Young Jeremy Creek
 Troy Davidson - Grandson
 Julie Dees - Additional Voices
 Haven Hartman - Little Swamp Girl
 Ashley Johnson - Granddaughter
 Melinda Peterson - Mrs. Holly Creek
 Philip Proctor - Mr. Junior Creek
 Neil Ross - Pout the Elf
 Hal Smith - Santa Claus
 B.J. Ward - Neighbor
 Paul Williams - Pomp the Elf

Crew
 Gordon Hunt - Recording Director
 Jill Ziegenhagen - Talent Coordinator
 Kris Zimmerman - Animation Casting Director
 Ruben Chavez - Background Painter

Home media
The special was released on VHS by Turner Home Entertainment under the Cartoon Network Video label in 1996 and featured on In2TV in 2006. On July 31, 2012, Warner Home Video released Hanna-Barbera Christmas Classics Collection on DVD in region 1 via their Warner Archive Collection. This is a Manufacture-on-Demand (MOD) release, available exclusively through Warner's online store and only in the US. This collection features a trilogy of Christmas specials: The Town That Santa Forgot, Casper's First Christmas and A Christmas Story.

VHS release dates
 September 24, 1996 (Turner Home Entertainment/Cartoon Network Video)
 September 29, 1998 (Turner Home Entertainment/Cartoon Network Video/Warner Home Video)
 November 2, 1999 (Turner Home Entertainment/Cartoon Network Video/Warner Home Video)
 October 31, 2000 (Turner Home Entertainment/Cartoon Network/Warner Home Video)
 October 16, 2001 (Turner Home Entertainment/Cartoon Network/Warner Home Video)

DVD release date
 July 31, 2012 (Warner Home Video/Warner Archive)

References

External links
  

1993 television specials
1993 animated films
1993 films
1990s American television specials
1990s animated short films
Christmas television specials
NBC television specials
Hanna-Barbera television specials
Santa Claus in television
Films scored by John Debney
American Christmas television specials
Animated Christmas television specials
1990s American films